Adutha Saattai is a 2019 Indian Tamil-language action drama film which is a sequel to Saattai (2012), written and directed by M. Anbazhagan. The film is the third installment in the Saattai franchise. It stars Samuthirakani and  Thambi Ramaiah with Athulya Ravi, debutant Kaushik Sundaram, and Yuvan in supporting roles. D. Imman who previously composed music for the prequel is replaced by Justin Prabhakaran. Principal photography of the film began on 12 December 2018.

Adutha Saattai is about the prevailing lapses in the Indian Education System. Considering the subject matter of the film, it was scheduled to be released in September 2019 worldwide  later moved to November.

Plot
Dayalan (Samuthirakani) is employed as a Tamil lecturer in a private arts and science college who is well-respected and loved by all the students for his caring approach, friendly nature, and open-mindedness towards students' empowerment. However, most of Dayalan's colleagues hate him, including the college principal Singaperumal (Thambi Ramaiah). Pazhanimuthu (Yuvan), who happens to be the only son of Singaperumal, falls in love with his classmate Podhumponnu (Athulya Ravi), but he does not have the courage to confess his love. Podhumponnu has a good image over Aadhi (Kaushik Sundaram), her classmate who hails from a poor family background. The college is divided based on two prominent caste groups, resulting in frequent clashes between students belonging to the respective castes. Dayalan tries hard to calm down students and instigate them to stay united despite coming from different caste backgrounds, which he accomplishes successfully. Dayalan also falls in love with his colleague Pachiammal (Rajshri Ponnappa), who shares his same ideologies, and they eventually get married.

Dayalan comes up with a plan of forming a group called “Students Parliament” whereby students should take responsibility in managing day-to-day activities of college such as cleanliness, infra facilities, etc. While Singaperumal and other lecturers hate this idea, local media channels appreciate Dayalan's efforts, thereby gaining a good image for the college. Dayalan also initiates a plan of arranging campus interviews for their students similar to engineering colleges so that students hailing from poor backgrounds should get benefited. Dayalan takes the necessary steps and meets different organizations, inviting them for the placement process in which he succeeds as well. This is also set as a good example for other arts and science colleges. Meanwhile, Aadhi gets a good job offer and dreams of improving his family's financial status.

Lecturers who were against Dayalan's ideologies understand him well and decide to stand with him, but still, Singaperumal's ego does not let him support Dayalan. Singaperumal starts showing his anger towards students more often and sends Aadhi out of his class. Angered by this, Pazhani also leaves the class. They both travel on a motorcycle, but they meet with a major accident where Aadhi passes away and Pazhani is badly injured. Hearing this, Singaperumal feels guilty for his behavior and transforms. To everyone's shock, Aadhi's caste leaders rush to college and start protesting in the name of caste with plans of getting some money from the college management. Dayalan secretly records their conversation and sends it to all students, thereby exposing the real intentions of the caste groups. College students unite and kick the caste leaders out from their college campus. Singaperumal apologizes to everyone, taking responsibility for Aadhi's death, and promises to Aadhi's family that Pazhani will take care of them.

Cast 

Samuthirakani as Dayalan
Thambi Ramaiah as M. Singaperumal
Athulya Ravi as Pothum Ponnu
Yuvan as Pazhanimuthu
Kaushik Sundaram as Aadhi
Rajshri Ponnappa as Pachaiammal
George Maryan as Gopal
Pichaikkaran Moorthy as Ponpandiyan
Benjamin as Professor
Sree Raam as Student
Nivetha as Sivasamy
Hello Kandasamy as Professor
Naadodigal Gopal as Aadhi's father
Saravana Sakthi as Lawyer
S. R. Dhivya Pradeepa as Professor
Kannika Ravi as Student
Pallavarajan as Pallavarajan
Subhashini Kannan as Paraa
Thavasi
Murali
Subiksha
Sheela
T. Sanghavi
Sasikumar as himself in the song "Vegadha Veyilula" (cameo appearance)

Production  
The film is produced by Dr.Prabhu Thilaak under the banner 11:11 Productions and  co-produced by P.Samuthirakani's Naadodigal. This is the maiden venture of Dr. Prabhu Thilaak's 11:11 Productions. Samuthirakani is cast as lead actor in the film while he was busy with his directorial ventures Naadodigal 2 and Appa 2. The shooting of the film commenced on 12 December 2018 in Chennai, the film titled as Adutha Saattai is not a sequel to the 2012 film Saattai, but the subject of Adutha Saattai is about the prevailing lapses in the Indian Education System.

Marketing and release 
The film was released in November 2019 worldwide.

Soundtrack 

The soundtrack is composed by Justin Prabhakaran and the lyrics are by Thenmozhi Das and Yugabharathi.

References

External links

2010s Tamil-language films
2019 action drama films
Indian action drama films
Indian sequel films
2019 films